Annularia is a form taxon, applied to  fossil foliage belonging to extinct plants of the genus Calamites in the order Equisetales.

Description
Annularia is a form taxon name given to leaves of Calamites. In that species, the leaves formed radiating leaf whorls at each stem node, in a similar way to the branches of Equisetum, an extant genus of horsetails. Annularia leaves are arranged in whorls of between 8-13 leaves. The leaf shape is quite variable, being oval in Annularia sphenophylloides and linear to lanceolate in Annularia radiata, but they are always flat and of varying lengths.

Fossil records
Fossils of this genus have been discovered in the Permian strata of Russia and in the Carboniferous (around ) strata of the United States, Canada, China and Europe.

See also
Coal forest

References

External links
 Fossil Museum

Horsetails
Carboniferous plants
Prehistoric plant genera
Carboniferous first appearances
Carboniferous extinctions
Fossil taxa described in 1821
Fossils of Georgia (U.S. state)
Paleozoic life of New Brunswick
Paleozoic life of Nova Scotia
Prehistoric plants of North America